Saint Mary's Cathedral Rubaga, commonly referred to as Rubaga Cathedral, is the parent cathedral of the Roman Catholic Archdiocese of Kampala, the oldest Roman Catholic diocese in Uganda. It is the home church of Archbishop of Kampala.

Location
The Cathedral is located on Lubaga Hill, in Lubaga Division, in the western part of the city of Kampala, the capital of Uganda and the largest city in that East African country. The coordinates of Rubaga Cathedral are:0°18'09.0"N, 32°33'08.0"E (Latitude:0.302500; Longitude:32.552222).

Overview
Kabaka Mutesa I Mukaabya Walugembe, the 30th [Kabaka of Buganda]], who reigned from 1856 until 1884, once maintained a palace on Lubaga Hill. When fire destroyed the palace, he abandoned the hill and relocated to Mengo Hill. In 1889, his son Mwanga II of Buganda, donated that land to the French Catholic missionaries (White Fathers) who were setting up the nascent Catholic church in the country, at that time. In 1914 the missionaries began constructing a modern cathedral at Lubaga (Rubaga). Construction was completed in 1925 and St. Mary's Cathedral Rubaga was consecrated on 31 December 1925.

Other considerations
The remains of the late Archbishop Joseph Kiwanka (June 25, 1899 —  February 22, 1966), the first African Catholic Bishop and the first African Archbishop of Kampala Diocese, are housed inside the cathedral.

See also

References

External links
  Rubaga Cathedral, The Seat of the Catholic Church In Uganda

Buildings and structures in Kampala
Roman Catholic cathedrals in Uganda
Lubaga Division
Roman Catholic churches completed in 1925
20th-century Roman Catholic church buildings in Uganda